Vladimir Nikolayevich Mozheyko (also Vladimir Mozeiko) is a Soviet sprint canoer who competed in the early 1990s. He won a bronze medal in the K-2 10000 m event at the 1990 ICF Canoe Sprint World Championships in Poznań.

References

Living people
Soviet male canoeists
Year of birth missing (living people)
ICF Canoe Sprint World Championships medalists in kayak